Ann Wolf (or similar) may refer to:
Anne Wolf (born 1967), Belgian pianist
Ann Wolfe (born 1971), American boxer
Ann Wolff (born 1937), a German glass artist